Anderson Rodrigues may refer to:

Anderson Rodrigues (footballer) (born 1982), Brazilian footballer
Anderson Rodrigues (volleyball) (born 1974), Brazilian volleyball player